Raiamas ansorgii is a species of ray-finned fish in the genus Raiamas. It is endemic to the Cuanza River in Angola.

References

Endemic fauna of Angola
Raiamas
Fish described in 1910